Bucculatrix mendax is a moth in the family Bucculatricidae. It was described in 1918 by Edward Meyrick. It is found in India.

The larvae feed on Dalbergia sissoo.

References

Bucculatricidae
Moths described in 1918
Taxa named by Edward Meyrick
Moths of Asia